Old Star is the 17th studio album by the Norwegian black metal band Darkthrone, released on 31 May 2019, by Peaceville Records. The album represented another drastic musical shift for the band, now featuring a doom metal style in the vein of Candlemass, combined with the band's more recent "blackened heavy metal" sound.

Track listing

Personnel
Darkthrone
 Nocturno Culto – vocals, guitar, bass, production
 Fenriz – drums, lyrics

Additional personnel
 Sanford Parker – mixing
 Jack Control – mastering
 Chadwick St. John – cover art

Charts

References

Darkthrone albums
2019 albums